James Rube Garrett Jr.  (June 5, 1922 – March 6, 2011) was an author and United States Marine Corps officer. He is the author of A Marine Diary: My Experiences on Guadalcanal, An Eyewitness Account of the Battle of Guadalcanal.  He was a Corporal, the Ammo Chief for I Battery, 3rd Battalion, 11th Regiment and a charter member of the 1st Marine Division, formed in Cuba in 1940.

Garrett penned diary entries during his four months of action at the Battle of Guadalcanal.  They detail the war in the Solomons as he lived in it.  It is a true eyewitness account of the Battle of Guadalcanal captured by a young 20-year-old Marine just as it was written many years ago.

His diary is cited and recognized by historians, universities, libraries, students, and people across the globe aiding in understanding not only the critical strategic and tactical elements of this battle, but the everyday life of a young Marine intent on his duty.

    

November 12, 1942

"Was given word to pack up and move at 3 o'clock. In rear echelon. Saw the most unusual sight yet. 16 torpedo planes shot down by 28 ships that were in the harbor. Big planes being shot down by Grummans and anti-aircraft fire. Really beautiful.

They flew in low, about 50 feet over the water. I remember we had 30 or 40 or 50 ships sitting in the harbor there, and tall grass covered dunes which you could get on and pretty much have a panoramic view of the whole bay. I remember seeing a big air raid come in and black anti-aircraft fire was coming crazy from all the ships in the harbor -- all kind of puffs of smoke hit the sky. In fact there were 16 torpedo bombers come over and I don't think they hit a thing; they were all being shot down and I think one or two got past the fleet. Our planes were after them too. And way out there on the horizon, we saw the last one go down -- all of them were shot down -- we could see the fire and the smoke. These were big two motor bombers: Japanese bombers burn real good."

See also

Battle of Guadalcanal
Guadalcanal
List of World War II battles

External links
 A Marine Diary: My Experiences on Guadalcanal can be found online and has numerous photographs which are of particular value to anyone interested in Guadalcanal.
Beyond All Boundaries  
Beyond All Boundaries: Rube Garrett:  
Garrett's award-winning site featuring his Marine Diary is listed on the official website of Solomon Islands Department of Commerce .
Garrett's A Marine Diary: My Experiences on Guadalcanal is one of the top 100 websites: World War II on the Web by J. Douglas Smith, Richard Jensen "...one of the very best sites on Guadalcanal."  
A Marine Diary Listed by Osprey's Publishing: Military History as a "favorite." 
Referenced on: Military.com   The Official Site of the Medal of Honor 
A Marine Diary is frequently noted on educational sites as historical evidence to the facts of the battle:
Encyclopedia of American History 
The History Teacher 
eMINTS:  Professional development for educators by educators 
ibiblio.org:  the public's library and digital archive 

McGraw-Hill Online Learning Center: A History of the Modern World, 9/e
R R Palmer, Yale University; Joel Colton, Duke University; Lloyd Kramer, University of North Carolina Chapel Hill 

United States Marine Corps personnel of World War II
Guadalcanal Campaign
1922 births
2011 deaths
American male writers